Kouts is a town in Pleasant Township, Porter County, in the U.S. state of Indiana. The population was 2,028 at the 2020 census. Since 2010, Kouts has had a population growth of 7.90 percent.

History

Bernhardt Kautz moved here from Pennsylvania, before the arrival of the railroads, and established a farm where the town now sits.  With the arrival of the Chicago and St. Louis Railway in 1865, Kautz and his brother-in-law H.A. Wright laid out the town and established a store.  Known as Kouts Station, the town grew slowly until the Chicago and Erie Railroad intersected the line in Kouts. Soon, Kouts became the social and economic center of the township.

Railroads
Kouts would remain an important railroad town throughout the first half of the 20th century continuing to be served by the Erie Lackawanna Railway and the Pennsylvania Railroad. Railroad traffic in the town began to decline following the bankruptcy of the Pennsylvania Railroad's successor, the Penn Central and the creation of Conrail. As the also bankrupt Erie Lackawanna would similarly be absorbed into the new company. The surplus of Conrail track through Kouts would lead to a decline in both traffic and profitability. The passage of the Staggers Rail Act of 1980 allowed for U.S railways to abandon unprofitable lines, which Conrail would take advantage of in Kouts. First with the Erie Lackawanna tracks in 1981 and then the Pennsylvania tracks in 1984. Currently there are little remnants of Kouts railroading past except for the former Pennsylvania Railroad depot which has been converted into a private business.

Geography

Demographics

2000 census
As of the census of 2000, there were 1,698 people, 678 households, and 499 families residing in the town. There were 720 housing units at an average density of 645.4/sq mi (248.2/km2). The racial makeup of the town was 99.00% White, 0.12% Asian, 0.65% from other races, and 0.24% from two or more races. Hispanic or Latino of any race were 1.24% of the population.

There were 678 households, out of which 34.1% had children under the age of 18 living with them, 60.5% were married couples living together, 9.9% had a female householder with no husband present, and 26.4% were non-families. 23.3% of all households were made up of individuals, and 9.6% had someone living alone who was 65 years of age or older. The average household size was 2.50 and the average family size was 2.94.

In the town the population was spread out, with 24.9% under the age of 18, 8.2% from 18 to 24, 31.2% from 25 to 44, 21.7% from 45 to 64, and 14.0% who were 65 years of age or older. The median age was 36 years. For every 100 females, there were 97.2 males. For every 100 females age 18 and over, there were 95.3 males.

The median income for a household in the town was $44,850, and the median income for a family was $50,819. Males had a median income of $42,315 versus $25,313 for females. The per capita income for the town was $19,239. About 1.7% of families and 3.2% of the population were below the poverty line, including 3.3% of those under age 18 and 3.4% of those age 65 or over.

2010 census
As of the census of 2010, there were 1,879 people, 719 households, and 524 families residing in the town. The racial makeup of the town was 97.6% White, 0.3% African American, 0.3% Native American, 0.6% Asian, 0.2% from other races, and 1.0% from two or more races. Hispanic or Latino of any race were 5.1% of the population.

There were 719 households, of which 37.8% had children under the age of 18 living with them, 61.2% were married couples living together, 8.6% had a female householder with no husband present, 3.1% had a male householder with no wife present, and 27.1% were non-families. 22.9% of all households were made up of individuals, and 10.8% had someone living alone who was 65 years of age or older. The average household size was 2.61 and the average family size was 3.09.

The median age in the town was 35.5 years. 27.8% of residents were under the age of 18; 5.6% were between the ages of 18 and 24; 32.2% were from 25 to 44; 21% were from 45 to 64; and 13.6% were 65 years of age or older. The gender makeup of the town was 48.2% male and 51.8% female.

Education
Kouts is served by the East Porter County School Corporation. It has one school which is K-12. Kouts is also home to the East Porter County School Corporation's central administration office which oversees the operation of four other public schools in Porter County. Kouts schools spend an average of $4,027 per student. The average school expenditure in the U.S. is $5,678. There are about 18.7 students per teacher.

Kouts has a public library, a branch of the Porter County Public Library System.

Infrastructure

Transportation
 State Route 8 goes west to Hebron and east through LaCrosse to Marshall County.
 State Route 49 goes north past Valparaiso to end at the Indiana Dunes State Park on Lake Michigan and south to State Route 14 in central Jasper County.

References

External links
 Town of Kouts

Northwest Indiana
Towns in Porter County, Indiana
Towns in Indiana
Populated places established in 1865
1921 establishments in Indiana